Glenmore is a suburban development and country club Albemarle County, Virginia, just east of Charlottesville. It has a golf course, equestrian complex, swimming pool, tennis courts, and a clubhouse. The price of homes range from $500,000 to $2.5 million.

Notable people
 Evelyn Magruder DeJarnette (1842–1914), author

References

External links
Glenmore Community Association

Unincorporated communities in Virginia
Unincorporated communities in Albemarle County, Virginia